"" ("Innsbruck, I must leave thee") is a German Renaissance song. It was first published as a choral movement by the Franco-Flemish composer Heinrich Isaac (ca. 1450–1517); the melody was probably written by him. The lyricist is unknown; an authorship of Emperor Maximilian I, as was previously assumed, seems highly unlikely. Chester Lee Alwes writes that the song "became the gold standard of the Lied genre".

Melody
There has been doubt whether the melody was in fact written by Heinrich Isaac or copied from earlier tunes. The melody was later used in a Lutheran chorale, "", and still appears in modern English-language hymnals under the name "Innsbruck", to a wide variety of text, of which the most common one is "The duteous day now closeth", a paraphrase of Paul Gerhardt's "Nun ruhen alle Wälder.

The hymn "" by Paul Fleming (1609–1640) was written for the same melody. Johann Sebastian Bach used it in several cantatas, especially in the chorale cantata In allen meinen Taten, BWV 97 (1734).

Lyrics 
The song is famously associated with the city of Innsbruck in Tyrol (in modern-day Austria). The lyrics express sorrow at having to leave a post at court, as the singer is forced to abandon his love and to depart to a foreign country. He promises her faithfulness and commends her to God's protection. Though Heinrich Isaac indeed spent some time in Innsbruck, the text was probably not written by him.

The stanzaic form consists of six iambic trimeters with a A–A–B–C–C–B rhyme scheme.

See also 
 Music of Innsbruck

References 
Notes

Sources

External links
 
 
 
 , Die Singphoniker
  Des außbunds schöner Teutscher Liedlein zu singen, Nürnberg: 1561. (discantus, altus, tenor, bassus)

Volkslied
Innsbruck
15th-century songs